82nd Regiment or 82nd Infantry Regiment may refer to:

 82nd Regiment of Foot (1778) 
 82nd Regiment of Foot (Prince of Wales's Volunteers) 
 82nd Infantry Regiment (Philippine Commonwealth Army) 
 82nd Field Artillery Regiment (United States) 
 82nd Cavalry Regiment (United States) 

American Civil War
 82nd Illinois Volunteer Infantry Regiment, a unit of the Union (Northern) Army 
 82nd Indiana Infantry Regiment, a unit of the Union (Northern) Army 
 82nd New York Volunteer Infantry Regiment, a unit of the Union (Northern) Army 
 82nd Ohio Infantry, a unit of the Union (Northern) Army 
 82nd Pennsylvania Infantry, a unit of the Union (Northern) Army

See also
 82nd Division (disambiguation)
 82nd Squadron (disambiguation)